Maszkowo may refer to the following places:
Maszkowo, Pomeranian Voivodeship (north Poland)
Maszkowo, Goleniów County in West Pomeranian Voivodeship (north-west Poland)
Maszkowo, Koszalin County in West Pomeranian Voivodeship (north-west Poland)
Maszkowo, Police County in West Pomeranian Voivodeship (north-west Poland)